Falua, also spelled faluwa, is a traditional open-deck boat of the Ivatan people from the islands of Sabtang and Batan in the Philippines. It can also be propelled by six to ten pairs of rowers. It can carry thirty passengers and is used to ferry goods between the islands. Modern falua are generally motorized. Falua is similar in shape to the chinarem but differs in that it is usually larger and has a flat transom.

See also
Avang
Chinedkeran
Tataya
Balangay
Basnigan
Bangka

References

Indigenous ships of the Philippines